The Toronto Jazz Festival is a jazz event in Toronto which takes place for 10 days in late June through early July. Unlike the Beaches International Jazz Festival, most of the events are indoors and located throughout the downtown core. The hub of the festival is Nathan Phillips Square, with more than 40 other locations spread out all across the city. It attracts over 500,000 people and is the city's third largest annual music festival next to NXNE and The Beaches International Jazz Festival. Incorporating a blend of jazz styles - from straight-ahead to bop to fusion to avant-garde- with tastes of other genres (for example, blues, funk, R&B, hip-hop, Latin, etc...) the festival has something for everyone. It was formerly known as the DuMaurier Jazz Festival, until the ban on tobacco advertising by the federal government forced the need for a new sponsor. Today, the festival is sponsored by TD Bank and has since dropped the word "Downtown" from its title.

Originally started in 1987, the Festival was co-founded by Executive Producer Patrick Taylor and Former Artistic Director Jim Galloway; currently, the Artistic Director is Josh Grossman. Roy Thomson Hall, the CN Tower and Metro Convention Centre were the three venues for that inaugural season. Miles Davis, Roberta Flack and Tony Bennett were the headliners that year.

External links
 Toronto Jazz Festival
 2006 Artist Interviews

Music festivals in Toronto
Jazz festivals in Canada
Music festivals established in 1987
1987 establishments in Canada